Embarrass is an unincorporated community in Embarrass Township, Saint Louis County, Minnesota, United States.

The community is located on the Mesabi Iron Range.

Geography and climate
Nearby places include Tower, Aurora, Hoyt Lakes, Biwabik, and Babbitt.

The center of Embarrass is generally considered near the intersection of Saint Louis County Roads 21, 362 (Waisanen Road), and 615 (Salo Road); located in the southeast portion of Embarrass Township (population 607). The Embarrass River flows through the community. The Pike River is also nearby.

State Highway 135 (MN 135), Saint Louis County Highway 21 (CR 21), and County Road 26 (CR 26) are three of the main routes in the Embarrass area.

Embarrass has a humid continental climate (Köppen Dfb), bordering very closely on a subarctic climate (Dfc), with short, warm summers and long, bitterly cold winters. Summer nights remain cool despite the warm days. In winter 2000–2001, the temperature in Embarrass did not rise above freezing from November 24 to March 1; the high for meteorological winter (December to February) was 32 °F on January 10.

The current record low temperature for Minnesota  was recorded outside of the nearby town of Tower on February 2, 1996, by the NWS Cooperative Observer located there.

The warmest night of the year averages  with the warmest low on record being .

The average first and last dates for a freeze are August 31 and June 20, giving Embarrass a short average growing season of only 72 days.

Name origins
The name Embarrass was derived from the French word embarras, based on its meaning of "to hinder with obstacles or difficulties". It was given this name by the French fur traders who were some of the first Europeans to visit the area, and who found the narrow, shallow river very difficult to navigate, and named the river "Embarras".

See also
 Embarrass Township

References

 Rand McNally Road Atlas – 2007 edition – Minnesota entry
 Official State of Minnesota Highway Map – 2011/2012 edition
 Mn/DOT map of Saint Louis County – Sheet 4 – 2011 edition

External links
 Embarrass.org – Community website

Unincorporated communities in Minnesota
Unincorporated communities in St. Louis County, Minnesota